Mount Britannia is a mountain,  high, rising in the center of Rongé Island, off the west coast of Graham Land. It was first charted by the Belgian Antarctic Expedition under Adrien de Gerlache, 1897–99. It was named by the UK Antarctic Place-Names Committee in 1960 after H.M. Yacht Britannia in which Prince Philip, Duke of Edinburgh, visited South Georgia, the South Shetland Islands and Graham Land in January 1957.

References
 

Mountains of Graham Land
Danco Coast